Metabolic bone disease is an abnormality of bones caused by a broad spectrum of disorders. Most commonly these disorders are caused by deficiencies of minerals such as calcium, phosphorus, magnesium or vitamin D leading to dramatic clinical disorders that are commonly reversible once the underlying defect has been treated. These disorders are to be differentiated from a larger group of genetic bone disorders where there is a defect in a specific signaling system or cell type that causes the bone disorder. There may be overlap. For example, genetic or hereditary hypophosphatemia may cause the metabolic bone disorder osteomalacia. Although there is currently no treatment for the genetic condition, replacement of phosphate often corrects or improves the metabolic bone disorder. Metabolic bone disease in captive reptiles is also common, and is typically caused by calcium deficiency in a reptile's diet.


Conditions considered to be metabolic bone disorders
 osteoporosis
 osteomalacia (adults) & rickets (children)
 osteitis fibrosa cystica
 Paget's disease of bone
 pyramiding (turtles)

Osteoporosis is due to causal factors like atrophy of disuse and gonadal deficiency. Hence osteoporosis is common in postmenopausal women and in men above 50 yrs. Hypercorticism may also be a causal factor, as osteoporosis may be seen as a feature of Cushing's syndrome.

References

External links 

Osteopathies